Julius Meier-Graefe (10 June 1867 – 5 June 1935) was a German art critic and novelist.

His writings on Impressionism, Post-Impressionism as well as on art of earlier and more recent generations, with his most important contributions translated into French, Russian and English, are considered to have been instrumental for the understanding and the lasting success of these artistic movements.

Biography 
Meier-Graefe was born in Reschitz, Banat, Hungary, then part of the Austro-Hungarian Empire, and now located in modern Romania. The family, including his brother , moved to a small town near Düsseldorf, Germany. He chose the hyphenated surname Meier-Graefe to honour the mother he never knew.

After studying engineering in Munich in 1888 and marrying Clotilde Vitzthum von Eckstädt (who was related to the art historian Georg Vitzthum von ), he moved to Berlin, where, in 1890, he took up the study of history in general and art history in particular. He began his literary career as a fiction writer with two novellas, Ein Abend bei Laura (1890) and Nach Norden (1893), His first work of art criticism, regarding Edvard Munch, was published in 1894. In 1895 he was among the founders of the arts and literary periodical Pan, but he left the magazine after a year and founded the Jugendstil (Art Nouveau) magazine Dekorative Kunst in 1897 and soon thereafter opened La Maison Moderne in Paris, a gallery that showcased Art Nouveau works. The gallery closed in 1903.

The centennial exhibition of German art in the National Gallery in Berlin in 1906 featured Meier-Graefe's presentation of previously little-known works, and through his efforts, the art of Caspar David Friedrich was first introduced to a wider audience. Similarly, his 1910 book Spanische Reise ("Spanish Journey") led to the "rediscovery" of El Greco and the positioning of the artist as a forerunner to the Expressionists.

Relocating to Paris, Meier-Graefe turned his attention on 19th century French painting; his 3-volume history of modern art (1904 and 1914–24) canonized the importance of French Impressionism. He wrote important biographies of many artists, including Paul Cézanne and Vincent van Gogh.

When World War I broke out, he volunteered in the Red Cross. He was sent to the Eastern front in 1915 and was captured and interned in a Russian POW camp in early 1915. Upon his return to Germany in late 1915, he divorced his first wife and married his second wife, Helene Lienhardt. The couple lived in Dresden, but travelled often, and considered France, especially Paris, a second home.

Meier-Graefe's third marriage was to Anna Marie Epstein (1905 - 1994), an illustrator and painter about 38 years his junior.  A wealthy heiress, she was the only child of a Jewish couple, Else Kohn (22 March 1880 - ?) and Walter Epstein (11 May 1874 - 3 February 1918); her maternal grandparents were Adolf Kohn, a prominent German-Jewish banker, and Anna Michaelis.

In 1930, Meier-Graefe and Epstein rented an estate called La Banette in Saint-Cyr-sur-Mer and they stayed there to escape the rise of the Nazi movement in Germany, where he was under attack for his promotion of what the National Socialists called "Degenerate Art." Meier-Graefe and Epstein encouraged and helped the landscape painter Walter Bondy and the writer René Schickele to relocate to the area as well, and they were a decisive impetus in the formation of a large German-Jewish refugee arts-colony in neighboring Sanary-sur-Mer, whose members included Thomas Mann, Lion Feuchtwanger, and Ludwig Marcuse.

He died in Vevey, Switzerland at the age of 67.

Writings 
 Ein modernes Milieu. in Dekorative Kunst (1901)
 English translation: A Modern Milieu. Ed. by Markus Breitschmid and Harry Francis Mallgrave. Backsburg, 2007, 
 Entwicklungsgeschichte der modernen Kunst: Vergleichende Betrachtung der bildenden Künste, als Beitrag zu einer neuen Aesthetik. 3 vols. Hofmann, Stuttgart 1904
 English translation: Modern Art: being a contribution to a new system of aesthetics. 3 vols. Heinemann, London; Putnam, New York 1908
 2nd revised and enlarged edition, Piper, Munich 1914 - 1922
 Der Fall Böcklin und die Lehre von den Einheiten. Stuttgart 1905
 Impressionisten: Guys - Manet - Van Gogh - Pissarro - Cézanne, mit einer Einleitung über den Wert der französischen Kunst und sechzig Abbildungen. Piper, Munich ¹1907 & Leipzig ²1907
 Three of these chapters have been reprinted separately, revised and enlarged:
 Édouard Manet
 Vincent van Gogh. Piper, Munich (Cover design after a drawing by Vincent van Gogh)
 4. - 6. Td.; 50 ill. and facsimile of a letter. Piper, Munich 1912 (published in two printings with deferring illustrations!)
 4th, improved edition; 50 ill. (not 40 ill., as stated on the title page!) and facsimile of a letter. Piper, Munich 1918
 5th, improved edition; 50 ill. and facsimile of a letter. Piper, Munich 1922
 6th, improved edition, 14. - 16. Td.; 54 ill. and facsimile of a letter. Piper, Munich 1929
 Paul Cézanne. Piper, Munich (Cover designed by Franz Marc, after a painting by Paul Cézanne)
 5th, totally revised edition, 7. - 10. Td.; 38 ill. Piper, Munich 1923
 Auguste Renoir, mit hundert Abbildungen. Piper, Munich 1911. 
 2nd edition 1920
 Courbet. Piper, Munich 1921
 Re-edited 1924
 Vincent. 2 vols. 103 plates. Piper, Munich ²1922
 Pre-release serialised in Der Neue Merkur 3 (1919/1920)& 4 (1920/1921):
 Vincent und Theo, Der Neue Merkur 3 (1919/1920), special issue: "Werden", pp. 37–78
 Van Gogh in Paris, Der Neue Merkur 4 (1920/1921), pp. 143–169
 Van Gogh in Arles, Der Neue Merkur 4 (1920/1921), pp. 445–460
 Das Gelbe Haus, Der Neue Merkur 4 (1920/1921), pp. 523–532
 Van Gogh und Gauguin, Der Neue Merkur 4 (1920/1921), pp. 622–643
 Fou-Roux (Der rote Narr), Der Neue Merkur 4( 1920/1921), pp. 685–696
 Van Gogh in St. Remy, Der Neue Merkur 4 (1920/1921), pp. 769–786
 Das Ende Van Goghs, Der Neue Merkur 4 (1920/1921), pp. 822–841
 Das Tage-Buch. Geständnisse meines Vetters. Novellen. Rowohlt, Berlin 1923
 Vincent van Gogh, der Zeichner. 52 plates. O. Wacker, Berlin 1928
 Renoir. , Leipzig 1929, with 407 illustrations and 10 plates

References 

1865 births
1935 deaths
19th-century German male writers
19th-century German writers
20th-century German male writers
German art critics
Hungarian art critics
Art Nouveau
Technical University of Munich alumni
Hungarian people of German descent
Hungarian people of Jewish descent
German people of Hungarian-Jewish descent
German people of Jewish descent
People from the Kingdom of Hungary
People from Reșița